Proyecto Dignidad (PD) is a Puerto Rican political party founded in 2019. In the 2020 general election it ran on a Christian democracy and anti-corruption platform.

History 
Project Dignity was first announced on March 24, 2019. On January 22, 2020, the party was officially certified as the 5th political party running in the 2020 general election. Afterwards in May, César Vázquez Muñiz, cardiologist; and Ada Norah Henriquez, attorney at law, were nominated for Governor and Resident Commissioner respectively.

2020 
On November 3, 2020, the party contested its first election. For the campaign, the party did not run candidates for every office. They opted to run for the governorship and resident commissary, as well as 1 candidate at-large for both legislative chambers. They also ran candidates in some representative and senatorial districts. Similarly, they only had a candidate in the mayoral race for San Juan, although they had previously certified Edgardo Cruz Vélez as candidate for Guánica, who did not win the race as an independent candidate after a vote recount. While their candidates for Governor and Resident Commissioner came 5th and 4th respectively, they won 1 at-large seat in both the House of Representatives and Senate.

Ideology 

Project Dignity intends to lead the process of defining  the Political status of Puerto Rico but does not endorse a specific territorial option. 

The party advocates for declaring pornography a public health issue and imposing restrictions on abortion permitted within the legal framework of Roe v. Wade. After Roe v. Wade was overturned in 2022 by the Supreme Court, the party presented a bill that would limit access to abortions to those pregnant for less than about six weeks.

In the 2021 session representative Lissie Burgos of the party attempted to introduce a bill to ban the use of hormone therapy on minors but it was defeated in committee.
Additionally the party also brought in House Bill 764 for review that would restrict athletes to participate in sports teams of their birth assigned gender. 

The parties candidate for mayor of San Juan in 2020, Nelson Rosario Rodríguez, ran on a self-described social market economy model, seeking to facilitate market activity while allowing for regulation in cases of negative external effects and to promote his policy agenda San Juan Somos su gente.

Electoral history

Gubernatorial elections

Resident Commissioner elections

Legislative elections

Party leaders 
César Vázquez Muñiz, founder of PD, president of the party and candidate for governor in 2020.

Ada Norah Henriquez, candidate for resident commissioner in 2020.

Joanne Rodríguez Veve, Senator for PD since 2021.

Lisie Janet Burgos Muñiz, representative for PD since 2021.

See also 

 Syncretic politics

References 

Political parties in Puerto Rico
Political parties established in 2019
2019 establishments in Puerto Rico